This is a list of episodes of the anime series The Heroic Legend of Arslan, based on the manga by Hiromu Arakawa, adapted from Japanese novel series of the same name by Yoshiki Tanaka based on the Persian epic, Amir Arsalan, divided into two seasons.

In the first season, from episodes 1 to 13, the opening theme is "Boku no Kotoba Dewanai Kore wa Boku-tachi no Kotoba" (These Aren't My Words. These Are Our Words) by UVERworld and the ending theme is "Lapis Lazuli" by Eir Aoi.  From episode 14 onwards, the opening theme is "Uzu to Uzu" (Swirl and Swirl) by NICO Touches the Walls and the ending theme is "One Light" by Kalafina.

For the second season, the opening theme is "Tsubasa" (Wings), performed again by Eir Aoi, and for the ending theme is "Blaze", performed again by Kalafina


Series overview

Episode list

The Heroic Legend of Arslan

Dust Storm Dance

References

Heroic Legend of Arslan, The